

National team
Russia played two friendly matches under the caretaker coach Aleksandr Borodyuk. On 1 March, they lost 0–1 to Brazil in Moscow, and on 27 May drew 0–0 with Spain in Albacete.

On 10 April Guus Hiddink announced that he will become manager of Russia team after 2006 FIFA World Cup. The contract was signed on 14 April.

 Russia score given first

Key
 H = Home match
 A = Away match
 F = Friendly
 ECQ = 2008 European Football Championship Qualifying, Group E

U-21 team
The under-21 team played in the qualification for the 2007 European Championship. Russia finished first in the group with Hungary and Finland, winning both matches, and qualified for the play-off against Portugal. In the first play-off match in Moscow, Russia took a 4–1 lead, but Portugal overcome the deficit in the return leg, winning 3–0 and qualifying for the final tournament on away goals.

U-19 team
The under-19 team finished third in group 1 of the elite round of 2006 European Championship. Russia's opponents were Austria, Hungary, and Slovenia.

U-17 team
The under-17 team won the 2006 European Championship in Luxembourg. After finishing second in a group with Spain, Hungary, and Luxembourg, Russia overcame Germany in the semifinal (1–0) and Czech Republic in the final on 14 May (2–2, 5–3 on penalties). This was the first time Russia won the U-17 European Championship. In order to qualify for the final tournament, Russia finished ahead of Italy, England, and Bulgaria in group 7 of the elite round.

Leagues

Premier League

CSKA Moscow won the 2006 title, Torpedo Moscow were relegated for the first time since 1938.

First Division

On 14 February two First Division clubs, Alania Vladikavkaz and Lokomotiv Chita, were denied professional licences by Professional Football League and excluded from professional football. On 22 February PFL decided to replace Alania and Lokomotiv with Lada Togliatti and Mashuk-KMV Pyatigorsk, the runners-up in the Second Division. The Russian Football Union did not endorse the exclusion and on 28 February decided to keep Alania and Lokomotiv in the First Division, giving them another chance to fulfill the league requirements. Consequently, on 6 March PFL decided to extend the First Division from 22 to 24 clubs, including Alania, Lokomotiv, Lada, and Mashuk-KMV.

However, on 20 March the Russian Football Union finally decided to exclude Alania and Lokomotiv from the league. This decision was announced by the Professional Football League on 21 March, five days before the start of the First Division.

Yevgeny Alkhimov became the top scorer for the second time in a row, this time for Ural with 25 goals.

Second Division
The following clubs have earned promotion by winning tournaments in their respective Second Division zones:
 FC Tekstilshchik-Telekom Ivanovo (West)
 FC Spartak-MZK Ryazan (Centre)
 FC Spartak Vladikavkaz (South)
 FC Nosta Novotroitsk (Ural-Povolzhye)
 FC Zvezda Irkutsk (East)

Russian Super Cup
CSKA Moscow, winners of both the league and the cup in 2005, met the league runners-up Spartak Moscow in a Super Cup match on 11 March. CSKA won the match 3–2.

Russian Cup
The cup final between CSKA Moscow and Spartak Moscow was won 3-0 by CSKA. Jô scored twice and Vagner Love once. Report

UEFA club competitions

UEFA Cup 2005/06
Lokomotiv Moscow and FC Zenit Saint Petersburg continued their participation in the 2005–06 UEFA Cup. Lokomotiv were knocked out in the round of 32 by Sevilla, and Zenit recorded two victories over Rosenborg and a win and a draw against Marseille to reach the quarterfinals, where they lost on aggregate to Sevilla, too. Zenit's run in the UEFA cup became the best in club's history.

Intertoto Cup 2006
FC Moskva participated in the UEFA Intertoto Cup 2006. After defeating Belarusian team MTZ-RIPO Minsk 3–0 on aggregate in the Second Round, Moskva were paired Hertha Berlin. First leg in Berlin finished 0-0, and Hertha won the second leg 2–0 to progress to the UEFA Cup.

UEFA Champions League 2006/07
CSKA Moscow and Spartak Moscow qualified for the group stage of the 2006–07 UEFA Champions League. CSKA defeated MFK Ružomberok 5–0 on aggregate in the third qualifying round. Spartak's qualification was harder, as they passed FC Sheriff Tiraspol on away goals after two draws in the second qualifying round, and FC Slovan Liberec 2–1 on aggregate.

Arsenal F.C., Futebol Clube do Porto, and Hamburger SV will be CSKA's opponents in the group stage, while Spartak will contend against Sporting Clube de Portugal, F.C. Internazionale Milano, and FC Bayern Munich.

UEFA Cup 2006/07
Lokomotiv Moscow and Rubin Kazan qualified for the first round of the 2006–07 UEFA Cup. Rubin participated in the second qualifying round, defeating BATE Borisov 5–0 on aggregate.

In the first round, Lokomotiv and Rubin played S.V. Zulte-Waregem and Parma F.C., respectively. Both Russian clubs were eliminated.

Women's football

Domestic competitions
Rossiyanka Moscow Oblast won the league, with Spartak Moscow finishing second and Nadezhda Noginsk third. The Cup also went to Rossiyanka, while Spartak were runners-up again.

National team
Russia women's national football team participated in the qualification for the 2007 FIFA Women's World Cup. They finished second behind Germany, failing to qualify.

U-20 World Championship
In August–September Russia hosted the 2006 FIFA U-20 Women's World Championship, held in Moscow and Saint Petersburg. The Russia national team finished second in group A which also included Brazil, Australia, and New Zealand, and lost 4–0 to China in the quarterfinal. The tournament was won by Korea DPR national team who defeated China 5–0 in the final at the Lokomotiv Stadium on 3 September.

U-19 national team
Russia qualified for the final tournament of the 2006 UEFA Women's U-19 Championship by winning the group including Portugal, Finland, and Israel in April. In the finals, Russia finished second in group B (with France, Switzerland and the Netherlands) and lost to hosts Germany 4–0 in the semifinal.

 
Seasons in Russian football